Independent Workers of Great Britain Union v Central Arbitration Committee [2021] EWCA Civ 952 is a UK labour law case, concerning sham self-employment and the human right to unionise and collectively bargain.

Facts
Deliveroo cyclists claimed that they should have the right to organise a union under the statutory procedure for recognition by their employer, Roofoods Ltd, under the Trade Union and Labour Relations (Consolidation) Act 1992. Their employer denied that they were even workers, or that workers had rights to organise and collectively bargain. The cyclists claimed before the UK government appointed Central Arbitration Committee that they should be recognised. The CAC argued they were not workers because they could provide substitutes and, in its view, this meant that they did not "personally perform work", as is necessary to be a "worker" under TULRCA 1992 section 296. In clause 8.1, the cyclists' contract said ‘Deliveroo recognises that there may be circumstances in which you may wish to engage others to provide the Services... it may not include an individual who has previously had their Supplier Agreement terminated by Deliveroo for a serious or material breach of contract or who... has engaged in conduct which would have provided grounds for termination... If your substitute uses a different vehicle type to you, you must notify Deliveroo in advance.’ And clause 8.2 said ‘It is your responsibility to ensure your substitute(s) have the requisite skills and training... payment to or remuneration of any substitute at such rate and under such terms as you may agree with that substitute, subject only to the obligations set out in this Agreement....’

In the High Court, Supperstone J held the CAC was not wrong. The cyclists appealed, arguing that that rights under the European Convention of Human Rights article 11 to freely organise and associate had been violated.

Judgment
The Court of Appeal held that the CAC was not wrong, and declined to follow Uber v Aslam which it said did not involve ECHR article 11. Underhill LJ gave the leading judgment.

Coulson LJ and Phillips LJ agreed.

See also
UK labour law

Notes

References

United Kingdom labour case law